In evidence-based medicine, likelihood ratios are used for assessing the value of performing a diagnostic test. They use the sensitivity and specificity of the test to determine whether a test result usefully changes the probability that a condition (such as a disease state) exists. The first description of the use of likelihood ratios for decision rules was made at a symposium on information theory in 1954. In medicine, likelihood ratios were introduced between 1975 and 1980.

Calculation

Two versions of the likelihood ratio exist, one for positive and one for negative test results.

The positive likelihood ratio is calculated as

which is equivalent to

or "the probability of a person who has the disease testing positive divided by the probability of a person who does not have the disease testing positive."
Here "T+" or "T−" denote that the result of the test is positive or negative, respectively. Likewise, "D+" or "D−" denote that the disease is present or absent, respectively. So "true positives" are those that test positive (T+) and have the disease (D+), and "false positives" are those that test positive (T+) but do not have the disease (D−).

The negative likelihood ratio is calculated as

which is equivalent to

or "the probability of a person who has the disease testing negative divided by the probability of a person who does not have the disease testing negative."

The calculation of likelihood ratios for tests with continuous values or more than two outcomes is similar to the calculation for dichotomous outcomes; a separate likelihood ratio is simply calculated for every level of test result and is called interval or stratum specific likelihood ratios.

The pretest odds of a particular diagnosis, multiplied by the likelihood ratio, determines the post-test odds. This calculation is based on Bayes' theorem.  (Note that odds can be calculated from, and then converted to, probability.)

Application to medicine
Pretest probability refers to the chance that an individual in a given population has a disorder or condition; this is the baseline probability prior to the use of a diagnostic test. Post-test probability refers to the probability that a condition is truly present given a positive test result. For a good test in a population, the post-test probability will be meaningfully higher or lower than the pretest probability. A high likelihood ratio indicates a good test for a population, and a likelihood ratio close to one indicates that a test may not be appropriate for a population.

For a screening test, the population of interest might be the general population of an area. For diagnostic testing, the ordering clinician will have observed some symptom or other factor that raises the pretest probability relative to the general population. A likelihood ratio of greater than 1 for a test in a population indicates that a positive test result is evidence that a condition is present. If the likelihood ratio for a test in a population is not clearly better than one, the test will not provide good evidence: the post-test probability will not be meaningfully different from the pretest probability. Knowing or estimating the likelihood ratio for a test in a population allows a clinician to better interpret the result.

Research suggests that physicians rarely make these calculations in practice, however, and when they do, they often make errors. A randomized controlled trial compared how well physicians interpreted diagnostic tests that were presented as either sensitivity and specificity, a likelihood ratio, or an inexact graphic of the likelihood ratio, found no difference between the three modes in interpretation of test results.

Estimation table 
This table provide examples of how changes in the likelihood ratio affects post-test probability of disease.

*These estimates are accurate to within 10% of the calculated answer for all pre-test probabilities between 10% and 90%. The average error is only 4%.  For polar extremes of pre-test probability >90% and <10%, see  section below.

Estimation example 
 Pre-test probability: For example, if about 2 out of every 5 patients with abdominal distension have ascites, then the pretest probability is 40%.
 Likelihood Ratio: An example "test" is that the physical exam finding of bulging flanks has a positive likelihood ratio of 2.0 for ascites.
 Estimated change in probability: Based on table above, a likelihood ratio of 2.0 corresponds to an approximately +15% increase in probability. 
 Final (post-test) probability: Therefore, bulging flanks increases the probability of ascites from 40% to about 55% (i.e., 40% + 15% = 55%, which is within 2% of the exact probability of 57%).

Calculation example

A medical example is the likelihood that a given test result would be expected in a patient with a certain disorder compared to the likelihood that same result would occur in a patient without the target disorder.

Some sources distinguish between LR+ and LR−. A worked example is shown below.

Confidence intervals for all the predictive parameters involved can be calculated, giving the range of values within which the true value lies at a given confidence  level (e.g. 95%).

Estimation of pre- and post-test probability

The likelihood ratio of a test provides a way to estimate the pre- and post-test probabilities of having a condition.

With pre-test probability and likelihood ratio given, then, the post-test probabilities can be calculated by the following three steps:

 
 
In equation above, positive post-test probability is calculated using the likelihood ratio positive, and the negative post-test probability is calculated using the likelihood ratio negative.

Odds are converted to probabilities as follows:

      

multiply equation (1) by (1 − probability) 

add (probability × odds) to equation (2)

divide equation (3) by (1 + odds)

hence

 Posttest probability = Posttest odds / (Posttest odds + 1)

Alternatively, post-test probability can be calculated directly from the pre-test probability and the likelihood ratio using the equation: 
P' = P0 × LR/(1 − P0 + P0×LR), where P0 is the pre-test probability, P' is the post-test probability, and LR is the likelihood ratio. This formula can be calculated algebraically by combining the steps in the preceding description.

In fact, post-test probability, as estimated from the likelihood ratio and pre-test probability, is generally more accurate than if estimated from the positive predictive value of the test, if the tested individual has a different pre-test probability than what is the prevalence of that condition in the population.

Example
Taking the medical example from above (20 true positives, 10 false negatives, and 2030 total patients), the positive pre-test probability is calculated as:

Pretest probability = (20 + 10) / 2030 = 0.0148
Pretest odds = 0.0148 / (1 − 0.0148) = 0.015
Posttest odds = 0.015 × 7.4 = 0.111
Posttest probability = 0.111 / (0.111 + 1) = 0.1 or 10%

As demonstrated, the positive post-test probability is numerically equal to the positive predictive value; the negative post-test probability is numerically equal to (1 − negative predictive value).

Notes

References

External links
Medical likelihood ratio repositories
 The Likelihood Ratio Database
 GetTheDiagnosis.org: A Database of Sensitivity and Specificity
 The NNT: LR Home

Medical statistics
Evidence-based medicine
Summary statistics for contingency tables